Synalissa may refer to:

 Synalissa (lichen), a genus of lichens in the family Lichinaceae
 Synalissa (moth), a genus of moths in the family Erebidae